Dianne Goldman Berman Feinstein (born Dianne Emiel Goldman; June 22, 1933) is an American politician who serves as the senior United States senator from California, a seat she has held since 1992. A member of the Democratic Party, she was mayor of San Francisco from 1978 to 1988.

Born in San Francisco, Feinstein graduated from Stanford University in 1955. In the 1960s, she worked in local government in San Francisco. Feinstein was elected to the San Francisco Board of Supervisors in 1969. She served as the board's first female president in 1978, during which time the assassinations of Mayor George Moscone and City Supervisor Harvey Milk by Dan White drew national attention. Feinstein succeeded Moscone as mayor and became the first woman to serve in that position. During her tenure, she led the renovation of the city's cable car system and oversaw the 1984 Democratic National Convention. Despite a failed recall attempt in 1983, Feinstein was a very popular mayor and was named the most effective mayor in the country by City & State in 1987.

After losing a race for governor in 1990, Feinstein won a 1992 special election to the U.S. Senate. The special election was triggered by the resignation of Pete Wilson, who defeated her in the 1990 gubernatorial election. Despite being elected on the same ballot as her peer Barbara Boxer, Feinstein became California's first female U.S. senator, as she was elected in a special election and sworn in before Boxer. She became the state's senior senator when Alan Cranston retired in January 1993. Feinstein has been reelected five times and in the 2012 election received 7.86 million votes, the most popular votes in any U.S. Senate election in history.

Feinstein authored the 1994 Federal Assault Weapons Ban, which expired in 2004. She introduced a new assault weapons bill in 2013 that failed to pass. Feinstein is the first woman to have chaired the Senate Rules Committee and the Senate Intelligence Committee, and the first woman to have presided over a U.S. presidential inauguration. She was the ranking member of the Senate Judiciary Committee from 2017 to 2021 and had chaired the International Narcotics Control Caucus from 2009 to 2015.

At , Feinstein is the oldest sitting U.S. senator and member of Congress. In March 2021, she became the longest-serving U.S. senator from California, surpassing Hiram Johnson. Upon Don Young's death in March 2022, she became the oldest sitting member of Congress. Upon Barbara Mikulski's retirement in January 2017, Feinstein became the longest-tenured female senator in office; on November 5, 2022, she surpassed Mikulski's record as the longest-tenured female senator. With Patrick Leahy's retirement, she became the seniormost Senate Democrat on January 3, 2023. By tradition, this made her eligible for Senate president pro tempore, but she declined the position, which went to Patty Murray instead.

Because of her age and reports of mental decline, Feinstein has been a frequent subject of discussion regarding her mental acuity and fitness to serve. In January 2023, California representatives Katie Porter and Adam Schiff announced their candidacy for the Senate seat Feinstein holds. In February 2023, Feinstein announced that she would not run for reelection to a sixth term.

Early life and education 
Feinstein was born Dianne Emiel Goldman in San Francisco to Leon Goldman, a surgeon, and his wife Betty (née Rosenburg), a former model. Her paternal grandparents were Jewish immigrants from Poland. Her maternal grandparents, the Rosenburgs, were from Saint Petersburg, Russia. While they were of German-Jewish ancestry, they practiced the Russian Orthodox (Christian) faith, as was required for Jews in Saint Petersburg. Christianity was passed down to Feinstein's mother, who insisted on her transferral from a Jewish day school to a prestigious local Catholic school, but Feinstein lists her religion as Judaism. 

She graduated from Convent of the Sacred Heart High School in 1951 and from Stanford University in 1955 with a Bachelor of Arts in history.
According to multiple sources, Feinstein's mother was abusive. Feinstein's sister, Yvonne Banks, said their mother had unpredictable moods. Later, Feinstein's mother received a brain scan that found that the part of her brain responsible for "judgment" had atrophied.

Early political career 

Feinstein was a fellow at the Coro Foundation in San Francisco from 1955 to 1956. Governor Pat Brown appointed her to the California Women's Parole Board in 1960. She served on the board until 1966.

San Francisco Board of Supervisors 
Feinstein was elected to the San Francisco Board of Supervisors in 1969. She remained on the board for nine years.

During her tenure on the Board of Supervisors, she unsuccessfully ran for mayor of San Francisco twice, in 1971 against Mayor Joseph Alioto, and in 1975, when she lost the contest for a runoff slot (against George Moscone) by one percentage point to Supervisor John Barbagelata.

Because of her position, Feinstein became a target of the New World Liberation Front, an anti-capitalist terrorist group that carried out bombings in California in the 1970s. In 1976 the NWLF placed a bomb on the windowsill of her home that failed to explode. The group later shot out the windows of a beach house she owned.

Feinstein was elected president of the San Francisco Board of Supervisors in 1978 with initial opposition from Quentin L. Kopp.

Mayor of San Francisco 

On November 27, 1978, Mayor George Moscone and Supervisor Harvey Milk were assassinated by former supervisor Dan White. Feinstein became acting mayor as she was president of the Board of Supervisors. Supervisors John Molinari, Ella Hill Hutch, Ron Pelosi, Robert Gonzales, and Gordon Lau endorsed Feinstein for an appointment as mayor by the Board of Supervisors. Gonzales initially ran to be appointed by the Board of Supervisors as mayor, but dropped out. The Board of Supervisors voted six to two to appoint Feinstein as mayor. She was inaugurated by Chief Justice Rose Bird of the Supreme Court of California on December 4, 1978, becoming San Francisco's first female mayor. Molinari was selected to replace Feinstein as president of the Board of Supervisors by a vote of eight to two.

One of Feinstein's first challenges as mayor was the state of the San Francisco cable car system, which was shut down for emergency repairs in 1979; an engineering study concluded that it needed comprehensive rebuilding at a cost of $60 million. Feinstein helped win federal funding for the bulk of the work. The system closed for rebuilding in 1982 and it was completed just in time for the 1984 Democratic National Convention. Feinstein also oversaw policies to increase the number of high-rise buildings in San Francisco.

Feinstein was seen as a relatively moderate Democrat in one of the country's most liberal cities. As a supervisor, she was considered part of the centrist bloc that included White and generally opposed Moscone. As mayor, Feinstein angered the city's large gay community by vetoing domestic partner legislation in 1982. In the 1980 presidential election, while a majority of Bay Area Democrats continued to support Senator Ted Kennedy's primary challenge to President Jimmy Carter even after it was clear Kennedy could not win, Feinstein strongly supported the Carter–Mondale ticket. She was given a high-profile speaking role on the opening night of the August Democratic National Convention, urging delegates to reject the Kennedy delegates' proposal to "open" the convention, thereby allowing delegates to ignore their states' popular vote, a proposal that was soundly defeated.

In the run-up to the 1984 Democratic National Convention, there was considerable media and public speculation that Mondale might pick Feinstein as his running mate. He chose Geraldine Ferraro instead. Also in 1984, Feinstein proposed banning handguns in San Francisco, and became subject to a recall attempt organized by the White Panther Party. She won the recall election and finished her second term as mayor on January 8, 1988.

Feinstein revealed sensitive details about the hunt for serial killer Richard Ramirez at a 1985 press conference, antagonizing detectives by publicizing details of his crimes known only to law enforcement, and thus jeopardizing their investigation.

City & State magazine named Feinstein the nation's "Most Effective Mayor" in 1987. She served on the Trilateral Commission during the 1980s.

Gubernatorial election 
Feinstein made an unsuccessful bid for governor of California in 1990. She won the Democratic Party's nomination, but lost the general election to Republican Senator Pete Wilson, who resigned from the Senate to assume the governorship. In 1992, Feinstein was fined $190,000 for failure to properly report campaign contributions and expenditures in that campaign.

U.S. Senate

Elections 

Feinstein won the November 3, 1992, special election to fill the Senate seat vacated a year earlier when Wilson resigned to take office as governor. In the primary, she had defeated California State Controller Gray Davis.

The special election was held at the same time as the general election for U.S. president and other offices. Barbara Boxer was elected at the same time to the Senate seat being vacated by Alan Cranston. Because Feinstein was elected to an unexpired term, she became a senator as soon as the election was certified in November, while Boxer did not take office until the expiration of Cranston's term in January; thus Feinstein became California's senior senator, even though she was elected at the same time as Boxer and Boxer had previous congressional service. Feinstein also became the first female Jewish senator in the United States, though Boxer is also Jewish. Feinstein and Boxer were also the first female pair of U.S. senators to represent any state at the same time. Feinstein was reelected in 1994, 2000, 2006, 2012, and 2018. In 2012, she set the record for the most popular votes in any U.S. Senate election in history, with 7.75 million, making her the first Senate candidate to get 7 million votes in an election. The record was previously held by Boxer, who received 6.96 million votes in her 2004 reelection; and before that by Feinstein in 2000 and 1992, when she became the first Democrat to get more than 5 million votes in a Senate race.

In October 2017, Feinstein declared her intention to run for reelection in 2018. She lost the endorsement of the California Democratic Party's executive board, which opted to support State Senator Kevin de León, but finished first in the state's "jungle primary" and was reelected in the November 6 general election.

At , Feinstein is the oldest sitting U.S. senator. On March 28, 2021, Feinstein became the longest-serving U.S. senator from California, surpassing Hiram Johnson. Upon Barbara Mikulski's retirement in January 2017, Feinstein became the longest-tenured female U.S. senator currently serving. On November 5, 2022, she also became the longest-serving woman in U.S. Senate history.

In January 2021, Feinstein filed the initial Federal Election Commission paperwork needed to seek reelection in 2024, when she will be 91. Her communications director issued a statement that this was due to election law technicalities, and was not indicative of her intentions in 2024. In February 2023, Feinstein announced that she would retire after finishing her term and would not run for reelection in 2024. Hours after the announcement was posted to Twitter, Feinstein appeared to be unaware of her own retirement when speaking to a reporter. She was quickly corrected by a staffer who informed her that the announcement had already been published.

Committee assignments 
Feinstein is the first woman to have chaired the Senate Rules Committee (2007–09) and the only woman to have chaired the Select Committee on Intelligence (2009–15).

 Committee on Appropriations
 Subcommittee on Agriculture, Rural Development, Food and Drug Administration, and Related Agencies
 Subcommittee on Commerce, Justice, Science, and Related Agencies
 Subcommittee on Defense
 Subcommittee on Energy and Water Development (Chair)
 Subcommittee on Interior, Environment, and Related Agencies
 Subcommittee on Transportation, Housing and Urban Development, and Related Agencies
 Committee on the Judiciary
 Subcommittee on the Constitution (Chair)
 Subcommittee on Criminal Justice and Counterterrorism
 Subcommittee on Federal Courts, Oversight, Agency Action and Federal Rights
 Subcommittee on Human Rights and the Law
 Committee on Rules and Administration
 Select Committee on Intelligence

Caucus memberships 
 Afterschool Caucuses
 Congressional NextGen 9-1-1 Caucus
 Senate New Democrat Coalition (defunct)

Political positions 

According to the Los Angeles Times, Feinstein emphasized her centrism when she first ran for statewide offices in the 1990s, at a time when California was more conservative. Over time, she has moved left of center as California became one of the most Democratic states, although she has never joined the ranks of progressives, and was once a member of the Senate's moderate, now-defunct Senate New Democrat Coalition.

Military 
While delivering the commencement address at Stanford Stadium on June 13, 1994, Feinstein said:

In 2017, she criticized the banning of transgender enlistments in the military under the Trump administration.

Feinstein voted for Trump's $675 billion defense budget bill for FY 2019.

National security 
Feinstein voted for the extension of the Patriot Act and the FISA provisions in 2012.

Health care 
Feinstein has supported the Affordable Care Act, repeatedly voting to defeat initiatives aimed against it. She has voted to regulate tobacco as a drug; expand the Children's Health Insurance Program; override the president's veto of adding 2 to 4 million children to SCHIP eligibility; increase Medicaid rebate for producing generic drugs; negotiate bulk purchases for Medicare prescription drugs; allow re-importation of prescription drugs from Canada; allow patients to sue HMOs and collect punitive damages; cover prescription drugs under Medicare, and means-test Medicare. She has voted against the Paul Ryan Budget's Medicare choice, tax and spending cuts; and allowing tribal Indians to opt out of federal healthcare. Feinstein's Congressional voting record was rated as 88% by the American Public Health Association (APHA), the figure ostensibly reflecting the percentage of time the representative voted the organization's preferred position.

At an April 2017 town hall meeting in San Francisco, Feinstein said, "[i]f single-payer health care is going to mean the complete takeover by the government of all health care, I am not there." During a news conference at the University of California, San Diego in July 2017, she estimated that Democratic opposition would prove sufficient to defeat Republican attempts to repeal the ACA. Feinstein wrote in an August 2017 op-ed that Trump could secure health care reform if he compromised with Democrats: "We now know that such a closed process on a major issue like health care doesn't work. The only path forward is a transparent process that allows every senator to bring their ideas to the table."

When Roe v. Wade was overturned in June 2022, Feinstein said it was a "dark day for our country" and that the decision "is an outrage for the women of this nation and will have catastrophic consequences for generations."

Capital punishment 
When Feinstein first ran for statewide office in 1990, she favored capital punishment. In 2004, she called for the death penalty in the case of San Francisco police officer Isaac Espinoza, who was killed while on duty. By 2018, she opposed capital punishment.

Energy and environment 

Feinstein achieved a score of 100% from the League of Conservation Voters in 2017. Her lifetime average score is 90%.

Feinstein co-sponsored (with Oklahoma Republican Tom Coburn) an amendment through the Senate to the Economic Development Revitalization Act of 2011 that eliminated the Volumetric Ethanol Excise Tax Credit. The Senate passed the amendment on June 16, 2011. Introduced in 2004, the subsidy provided a 45-cent-per-gallon credit on pure ethanol, and a 54-cent-per-gallon tariff on imported ethanol. These subsidies had resulted in an annual expenditure of $6 billion.

In February 2019, when youth associated with the Sunrise Movement confronted Feinstein about why she does not support the Green New Deal, she told them "there’s no way to pay for it" and that it could not pass a Republican-controlled Senate. In a tweet following the confrontation, Feinstein said that she remains committed "to enact real, meaningful climate change legislation."

Supreme Court nominations 

In September 2005, Feinstein was one of five Democratic senators on the Senate Judiciary Committee to vote against Supreme Court nominee John Roberts, saying that Roberts had "failed to state his positions on such social controversies as abortion and the right to die".

Feinstein stated that she would vote against Supreme Court nominee Samuel Alito in January 2006, though she expressed disapproval of a filibuster: "When it comes to filibustering a Supreme Court appointment, you really have to have something out there, whether it's gross moral turpitude or something that comes to the surface. This is a man I might disagree with, [but] that doesn't mean he shouldn't be on the court."

On July 12, 2009, Feinstein stated her belief that the Senate would confirm Supreme Court nominee Sonia Sotomayor, praising her for her experience and for overcoming "adversity and disadvantage".

After President Obama nominated Merrick Garland to the Supreme Court in March 2016, Feinstein met with Garland on April 6 and later called on Republicans to do "this institution the credit of sitting down and meeting with him".

In February 2017, Feinstein requested that Supreme Court nominee Neil Gorsuch provide information on cases in which he had assisted with decision-making regarding either litigation or craft strategy. In mid-March, she sent Gorsuch a letter stating her request had not been met. Feinstein formally announced her opposition to his nomination on April 3, citing Gorsuch's "record at the Department of Justice, his tenure on the bench, his appearance before the Senate and his written questions for the record".

Following the nomination of Brett Kavanaugh to the Supreme Court of the United States, Feinstein received a July 30, 2018, letter from Christine Blasey Ford in which Ford accused Kavanaugh of having sexually assaulted her in the 1980s. Ford requested that her allegation be kept confidential. Feinstein did not refer the allegation to the FBI until September 14, 2018, after the Senate Judiciary Committee had completed its hearings on Kavanaugh's nomination and "after leaks to the media about [the Ford allegation] had reached a 'fever pitch'". Feinstein faced "sharp scrutiny" for her decision to keep quiet about the Ford allegation for several weeks; she responded that she kept the letter and Ford's identity confidential because Ford had requested it. After an additional hearing and a supplemental FBI investigation, Kavanaugh was confirmed to the Supreme Court on October 6, 2018.

Feinstein announced she would step down from her position on the Judiciary Committee after pressure from progressives due to her performance at the Supreme Court nomination hearings of Justice Amy Coney Barrett in October 2020. Articles in The New Yorker and The New York Times cited unnamed Democratic senators and aides expressing concern over her advancing age and ability to lead the committee.

Weapons sales 
In September 2016, Feinstein backed the Obama administration's plan to sell more than $1.15 billion worth of weapons to Saudi Arabia.

Mass surveillance; citizens' privacy 
Feinstein co-sponsored PIPA on May 12, 2011. She met with representatives of technology companies, including Google and Facebook, in January 2012. A Feinstein spokesperson said she "is doing all she can to ensure that the bill is balanced and protects the intellectual property concerns of the content community without unfairly burdening legitimate businesses such as Internet search engines".

Following her 2012 vote to extend the Patriot Act and the FISA provisions, and after the 2013 mass surveillance disclosures involving the National Security Agency (NSA), Feinstein promoted and supported measures to continue the information collection programs. Feinstein and Saxby Chambliss also defended the NSA's request to Verizon for all the metadata about phone calls made within the U.S. and from the U.S. to other countries. They said the information gathered by intelligence on the phone communications is used to connect phone lines to terrorists and that it did not contain the content of the phone calls or messages. Foreign Policy wrote that she had a "reputation as a staunch defender of NSA practices and [of] the White House's refusal to stand by collection activities targeting foreign leaders".

In October 2013, Feinstein criticized the NSA for monitoring telephone calls of foreign leaders friendly to the U.S. In November 2013, she promoted the FISA Improvements Act bill, which included a "backdoor search provision" that allows intelligence agencies to continue certain warrantless searches as long as they are logged and "available for review" to various agencies.

In June 2013, Feinstein called Edward Snowden a "traitor" after his leaks went public. In October 2013, she said she stood by that.

While praising the NSA, Feinstein had accused the CIA of snooping and removing files through Congress members' computers, saying, "[t]he CIA did not ask the committee or its staff if the committee had access to the internal review or how we obtained it. Instead, the CIA just went and searched the committee's computer." She claimed the "CIA's search may well have violated the separation of powers principles embodied in the United States Constitution".

After the 2016 FBI–Apple encryption dispute, Feinstein and Richard Burr sponsored a bill that would be likely to criminalize all forms of strong encryption in electronic communication between citizens. The bill would require technology companies to design their encryption so that they can provide law enforcement with user data in an "intelligible format" when required to do so by court order.

In 2020, Feinstein co sponsored the EARN IT act, which seeks to create a 19-member committee to decide a list of best practices websites must follow to be protected by section 230 of the Communications Decency Act. The EARN IT act effectively outlaws end-to-end encryption, depriving the world of secure, private communications tools.

Assault weapons ban 

Feinstein introduced the Federal Assault Weapons Ban, which became law in 1994 and expired in 2004. In January 2013about a month after the Sandy Hook Elementary School shootingshe and Representative Carolyn McCarthy proposed a bill that would "ban the sale, transfer, manufacturing or importation of 150 specific firearms including semiautomatic rifles or pistols that can be used with a detachable or fixed ammunition magazines that hold more than 10 rounds and have specific military-style features, including pistol grips, grenade launchers or rocket launchers". The bill would have exempted 900 models of guns used for sport and hunting. Feinstein said of the bill, "The common thread in each of these shootings is the gunman used a semi-automatic assault weapon or large-capacity ammunition magazines. Military assault weapons only have one purpose, and in my opinion, it's for the military." The bill failed on a Senate vote of 60 to 40.

Marijuana legalization 
Feinstein has opposed a number of reforms to cannabis laws at the state and federal level. In 2016 she opposed Proposition 64, the Adult Use of Marijuana Act, to legalize recreational cannabis in California. In 1996 she opposed Proposition 215 to legalize the medical use of cannabis in California. In 2015 she was the only Democrat at a Senate hearing to vote against the Rohrabacher–Farr amendment, legislation that limits the enforcement of federal law in states that have legalized medical cannabis. Feinstein cited her belief that cannabis is a gateway drug in voting against the amendment.

In 2018, Feinstein softened her views on marijuana and cosponsored the STATES Act, legislation that would protect states from federal interference regarding both medical and recreational use. She also supported legislation in 2015 to allow medical cannabis to be recommended to veterans in states where its use is legal.

Immigration 
In September 2017, after Attorney General Jeff Sessions announced the rescinding of the Deferred Action for Childhood Arrivals program, Feinstein admitted the legality of the program was questionable while citing this as a reason for why a law should be passed. In her opening remarks at a January 2018 Senate Judiciary Committee hearing, she said she was concerned the Trump administration's decision to terminate temporary protected status might be racially motivated, based on comments Trump made denigrating African countries, Haiti, and El Salvador.

Iran 
Feinstein announced her support for the Iran nuclear deal framework in July 2015, tweeting that the deal would usher in "unprecedented & intrusive inspections to verify cooperation" on the part of Iran.

On June 7, 2017, Feinstein and Senator Bernie Sanders issued dual statements urging the Senate to forgo a vote for sanctions on Iran in response to the Tehran attacks that occurred earlier in the day.

In July 2017, Feinstein voted for the Countering America's Adversaries Through Sanctions Act that grouped together sanctions against Iran, Russia and North Korea.

Israel 
In September 2016in advance of UN Security Council resolution 2334 condemning Israeli settlements in the occupied Palestinian territoriesFeinstein signed an AIPAC-sponsored letter urging Obama to veto "one-sided" resolutions against Israel.

Feinstein opposed Trump's decision to recognize Jerusalem as Israel's capital, saying, "Recognizing Jerusalem as Israel's capitalor relocating our embassy to Jerusalemwill spark violence and embolden extremists on both sides of the debate."

North Korea 

During a July 2017 appearance on Face the Nation after North Korea conducted a second test of an intercontinental ballistic missile, Feinstein said the country had proven itself a danger to the U.S. She also expressed her disappointment with China's lack of response.

Responding to reports that North Korea had achieved successful miniaturization of nuclear warheads, Feinstein issued an August 8, 2017, statement insisting isolation of North Korea had proven ineffective and Trump's rhetoric was not helping resolve potential conflict. She also called for the U.S. to "quickly engage North Korea in a high-level dialogue without any preconditions".

In September 2017, after Trump's first speech to the United Nations General Assembly in which he threatened North Korea, Feinstein released a statement disagreeing with his remarks: "Trump's bombastic threat to destroy North Korea and his refusal to present any positive pathways forward on the many global challenges we face are severe disappointments."

China 
Feinstein supports a conciliatory approach between China and Taiwan and fostered increased dialogue between high-level Chinese representatives and U.S. senators during her first term as senator. When asked about her relation with Beijing, Feinstein said, "I sometimes say that in my last life maybe I was Chinese."

Feinstein has criticized Beijing's missile tests near Taiwan and has called for dismantlement of missiles pointed at the island. She promoted stronger business ties between China and Taiwan over confrontation, and suggested that the U.S. patiently "use two-way trade across Taiwan Strait as a platform for more political dialogue and closer ties".

She believes that deeper cross-strait economic integration "will one day lead to political integration and will ultimately provide the solution" to the Taiwan issue.

On July 27, 2018, reports surfaced that a Chinese staff member who worked as Feinstein's personal driver, gofer and liaison to the Asian-American community for 20 years, was caught reporting to China's Ministry of State Security. According to the reports, the FBI contacted Feinstein five years earlier warning her about the employee. The employee was later interviewed by authorities and forced to retire by Feinstein. No criminal charges were filed against them.

Torture 
Feinstein has served on the Senate's Select Committee on Intelligence since before 9/11 and her time on the committee has coincided with the Senate Report on Pre-war Intelligence on Iraq and the debates on the torture/"enhanced interrogation" of terrorists and alleged terrorists. On the Senate floor on December 9, 2014, the day parts of the Senate Intelligence Committee report on CIA torture were released to the public, Feinstein called the government's detention and interrogation program a "stain on our values and on our history".

Fusion GPS interview transcript release 
On January 9, 2018, Feinstein caused a stir when, as ranking member of the Senate Judiciary Committee, she released a transcript of its August 2017 interview with Fusion GPS co-founder Glenn Simpson about the dossier regarding connections between Trump's campaign and the Russian government. She did this unilaterally after the committee's chairman, Chuck Grassley, refused to release the transcript.

Presidential politics 
During the 1980 presidential election, Feinstein served on President Jimmy Carter's steering committee in California and as a Carter delegate to the Democratic National Convention. She was selected to serve as one of the four chairs of the 1980 Democratic National Convention.

Feinstein endorsed former Vice President Walter Mondale during the 1984 presidential election. She and Democratic National Committee chairman Charles Manatt signed a contract in 1983, making San Francisco the host of the 1984 Democratic National Convention.

As a superdelegate in the 2008 Democratic presidential primaries, Feinstein said she would support Clinton for the nomination. But after Barack Obama became the presumptive nominee, she fully backed his candidacy. Days after Obama amassed enough delegates to win the nomination, Feinstein lent her Washington, D.C., home to Clinton and Obama for a private one-on-one meeting. She did not attend the 2008 Democratic National Convention in Denver because she had fallen and broken her ankle earlier in the month.

Feinstein chaired the United States Congress Joint Committee on Inaugural Ceremonies and acted as mistress of ceremonies, introducing each participant at the 2009 presidential inauguration. She is the first woman to have presided over a U.S. presidential inauguration.

Ahead of the 2016 presidential election, Feinstein was one of 16 female Democratic senators to sign an October 20, 2013, letter endorsing Hillary Clinton for president.

As the 2020 presidential election approached, Feinstein indicated her support for former Vice President Joe Biden. This came as a surprise to many pundits, due to the potential candidacy of fellow California senator Kamala Harris, of whom Feinstein said "I'm a big fan of Sen. Harris, and I work with her. But she's brand-new here, so it takes a little bit of time to get to know somebody."

President pro tempore 
The role of president pro tempore, third in line to the US presidency, traditionally goes to the senior member of the majority party. This senior member is Feinstein after Patrick Leahy retired on January 3, 2023. But on October 22, 2022, Feinstein said that she would not be interested in the role were it offered to her. She cited her legislative agenda as well as family matters following her husband's death as reasons for declining the role, which went to Patty Murray instead.

Awards and honors 
Feinstein was awarded the honorary degree of Doctor of Laws from Golden Gate University in San Francisco on June 4, 1977. She was awarded the Legion of Honour by France in 1984. Feinstein received with the Woodrow Wilson Award for public service from the Woodrow Wilson Center of the Smithsonian Institution on November 3, 2001, in Los Angeles. In 2002, Feinstein won the American Medical Association's Nathan Davis Award for "the Betterment of the Public Health". She was named as one of The Forward 50 in 2015.

Offices held

Personal life 

Feinstein has been married three times. She married Jack Berman ( 2002), who was then working in the San Francisco District Attorney's Office, in 1956. She and Berman divorced three years later. Their daughter, Katherine Feinstein Mariano ( 1957), was the presiding judge of the San Francisco Superior Court for 12 years, through 2012. In 1962, shortly after beginning her career in politics, Feinstein married her second husband, neurosurgeon Bertram Feinstein, who died of colon cancer in 1978. Feinstein was then married to investment banker Richard C. Blum from 1980 until his death from cancer in 2022.

In 2003, Feinstein was ranked the fifth-wealthiest senator, with an estimated net worth of $26 million. Her net worth increased to between $43 and $99 million by 2005. Her 347-page financial-disclosure statement, characterized by the San Francisco Chronicle as "nearly the size of a phone book", claims to draw clear lines between her assets and her husband's, with many of her assets in blind trusts.

Feinstein had an artificial cardiac pacemaker inserted at George Washington University Hospital in January 2017. In the fall of 2020, following Ruth Bader Ginsburg's death and the confirmation hearings for Supreme Court Justice Amy Coney Barrett, there was concern about Feinstein's ability to continue performing her job. She said there was no cause for concern and that she had no plans to leave the Senate.

In mass media 
The 2019 film The Report, about the Senate Intelligence Committee investigation into the CIA's use of torture, extensively features Feinstein, portrayed by Annette Bening.

Electoral history

See also 
 Rosalind Wiener Wyman, co-chair of Feinstein political campaigns.
 Women in the United States Senate
 2020 congressional insider trading scandal

References

Notes

Additional sources 
 Roberts, Jerry (1994). Dianne Feinstein: Never Let Them See You Cry, Harpercollins. 
 Talbot, David (2012). Season of the Witch: Enchantment, Terror and Deliverance in the City of Love, New York: Simon and Schuster. 480 p. .

External links 

 Senator Dianne Feinstein official U.S. Senate website
 Campaign website 
 
 

 Membership at the Council on Foreign Relations

Statements
 Op-ed archives at Project Syndicate
 Dianne Feinstein's Opening Remarks at the 2009 Presidential Inauguration at AmericanRhetoric.com, video, audio and text

1933 births
Living people
20th-century American Jews
20th-century American politicians
20th-century American women politicians
21st-century American Jews
21st-century American politicians
21st-century American women politicians
Activists from California
American gun control activists
American Jews from California
American people of German-Jewish descent
American people of Polish-Jewish descent
American people of Russian-Jewish descent
California Democrats
Candidates in the 1990 United States elections
Democratic Party United States senators from California
Female United States senators
Jewish American people in California politics
Jewish United States senators
Jewish activists
Jewish mayors of places in the United States
Jewish women politicians
Mayors of San Francisco
San Francisco Board of Supervisors members
Schools of the Sacred Heart alumni
Stanford University alumni
Women city councillors in California
Women mayors of places in California